Paradela is a Portuguese freguesia ("civil parish"), located in the municipality of Barcelos. The population in 2011 was 850, in an area of 8.36 km2.

References

Freguesias of Barcelos, Portugal